Thomas Evans (died 12 August 1815) was a British churchman, Archdeacon of Worcester from 1787. He left a travel diary, covering journeys in the period 1755–1759.

References

1815 deaths
British diarists
Archdeacons of Worcester